Cedarhurst is a village in the Town of Hempstead in Nassau County, on the South Shore of Long Island, in New York, United States. The population was 6,592 at the 2010 census.

The Incorporated Village of Cedarhurst is located in the region of Long Island's South Shore known as the Five Towns.

History
The village was incorporated in 1910. It is part of the "Five Towns," together with the village of Lawrence and the hamlets of Woodmere and Inwood, and "The Hewletts," which consist of the villages of Hewlett Bay Park, Hewlett Harbor and Hewlett Neck and the hamlet of Hewlett, along with Woodsburgh.

Cedarhurst's early name was Ocean Point. Rail service arrived in 1869 which led people to the area, especially to the Rockaway Hunting Club, built in Cedarhurst in 1878. A post office was established in 1884, and Ocean Point was renamed Cedarhurst, partly at the request of the Hunt Club. The name Cedarhurst is in reference to a grove of trees that once stood at the post office.

For many years, Central Avenue, the area's main business district, was considered the Rodeo Drive of Long Island, offering upscale shops and boutiques to discriminating shoppers from around the area. With the growth of the local Orthodox Jewish community, many stores and restaurants now cater to the needs of this community. As observant Jews do not shop on the Jewish Sabbath, many of the street's businesses are closed on Saturday, reducing the foot traffic for those stores that remain open on Saturdays.

On November 22, 2019, a fire broke out at the Cedarhurst Shoppes, which affected five businesses of various types and significantly damaged them.

Geography

According to the United States Census Bureau, the village has a total area of 0.7 square miles (1.8 km2), all land.

Demographics

As of the census of 2000, there were 6,164 people, 2,289 households, and 1,636 families residing in the village. The population density was 9,042.0 people per square mile (3,499.9/km2). There were 2,366 housing units at an average density of 3,470.7 per square mile (1,343.4/km2). The racial makeup of the village was 90.74% White, 1.28% African American, 0.11% Native American, 3.08% Asian, 2.94% from other races, and 1.85% from two or more races. Hispanic or Latino of any race were 8.35% of the population.

There were 2,289 households, out of which 31.5% had children under the age of 18 living with them, 59.1% were married couples living together, 9.2% had a female householder with no husband present, and 28.5% were non-families. 24.5% of all households were made up of individuals, and 13.6% had someone living alone who was 65 years of age or older. The average household size was 2.69 and the average family size was 3.25.

In the village, the population was spread out, with 25.1% under the age of 18, 6.3% from 18 to 24, 27.5% from 25 to 44, 24.0% from 45 to 64, and 17.2% who were 65 years of age or older. The median age was 39 years. For every 100 females, there were 91.0 males. For every 100 females age 18 and over, there were 85.6 males.

The median income for a household in the village was $56,441, and the median income for a family was $71,406. Males had a median income of $52,460 versus $37,292 for females. The per capita income for the village was $29,591. About 4.3% of families and 5.3% of the population were below the poverty line, including 7.3% of those under age 18 and 5.9% of those age 65 or over.

Over the past twenty years significant numbers of Orthodox Jewish families have moved into Cedarhurst supporting synagogues and other Jewish organizations. Italian-Americans (15.3%), Russian Americans (10.5%), Polish-Americans (9.7%) and Irish-Americans (6.9%) also make up a large percentage of the Five Towns community.

Education

Cedarhurst is part of School District 15 and is served by the Lawrence Public Schools. Lawrence High School as well as the #5 Elementary School, which serve students from a number of surrounding communities, are located in Cedarhurst.

Cedarhurst is also home to the Hebrew Academy of the Five Towns and Rockaway High School and a Kahal school, both located on Central Avenue.

Religion

Cedarhurst is home to a number of shuls, including Temple Beth El, the Chofetz Chaim Torah Center, Congregation Tifereth Zvi, Kehilas Bais Yehuda Tzvi (otherwise known as The Red Shul), Agudath Israel of the Five Towns, Chabad of the Five Towns, Kehilas Bais Yisroel and the Young Israel of Lawrence Cedarhurst.

The town is also home to St. Joachim Church of the Roman Catholic Diocese of Rockville Centre, also on Central Avenue. The church's parish elementary school was closed in June 2005 due to declining enrollment in the school's area over the previous decade.

Government
 
  Mayor Benjamin Weinstock
 Deputy Mayor Ari Brown 2001–present 
 Village Justice Hon. Andrew Goldsmith (2013–present)
 Village Trustee Daniel Plaut. (2019–present)
 Village trustee Myrna Zisman 2008 to present
 Village Trustee , Israel Wasser 2015 to present

Transportation

Train 
The Cedarhurst station provides Long Island Rail Road service on the Far Rockaway Branch to Penn Station in Midtown Manhattan and the Atlantic Terminal in Brooklyn.

Bus 
Nassau Inter-County Express regularly services the neighborhood with the n31 and n32 buses. The MTA offers limited service with the Q111 bus, running only one trip a day in each direction.

Emergency services
The Nassau County Police Department provides police services in Cedarhurst and most of Nassau County. Cedarhurst is part of the force's Fourth Precinct.

Cedarhurst is served by the Lawrence-Cedarhurst Fire Department.  The LCFD consists of close to 80 volunteer firefighters and provides fire protection to the villages of Lawrence and Cedarhurst, as well as the North Lawrence Fire District and East Lawrence Fire District.  The LCFD also responds to alarms such as car accidents and aided cases on the Atlantic Beach Bridge. The Chief of the Lawrence-Cedarhurst Fire Department is James McHugh.

Notable people

 Lyle Alzado (1949–1992), actor and All Pro National Football League defensive lineman
 Jake Burton (1954–2019), snowboarding pioneer
 Helen Hicks (1911–1974), pro golfer who was one of the 13 co-founders of the LPGA in 1950.
 Red Holzman (1920–1998), two-time NBA All-Star guard, former coach of the New York Knicks, Hall of Fame
 Alan Kalter (born 1943), announcer on the Late Show with David Letterman.
 Shane Olivea (1981-2022), football player
 Lil Tecca (born 2002), rapper, singer and songwriter.
 Evan Roberts (born 1983), radio personality
 Michael Scanlan (1931–2017), Roman Catholic priest.
 Rodolfo Valentin (born 1944), celebrity hair stylist

In popular culture 
 Parts of the movie Married to the Mob, most notably the opening scene at the train station, were filmed in Cedarhurst.

See also
 List of Italian-American neighborhoods

References

External links

 Official website

Five Towns
Villages in New York (state)
Villages in Nassau County, New York